Trilacuna is a genus of goblin spiders native to Southeast Asia, first described by Tong & Li in 2007. They look similar to members of Silhouettella, but males can be distinguished by their large palpal femur, among several other more complicated defining features. The name is a combination of the Latin terms "tri" and "lacuna", referring to the three-branched endites in males and the three-notched labium in females.

Species
, it contains 29 species.
 Trilacuna aenobarba (Brignoli, 1978) — Bhutan
 Trilacuna alces Eichenberger, 2011 — Thailand
 Trilacuna angularis Tong & Li, 2007 — China
 Trilacuna bangla Grismado & Ramírez, 2014 — India, Nepal
 Trilacuna bawan Tong, Zhang & Li, 2019 — China
 Trilacuna besucheti Grismado & Piacentini, 2014 — China
 Trilacuna bilingua Eichenberger, 2011 — Malaysia
 Trilacuna clarissa Eichenberger, 2011 — Sumatra
 Trilacuna datang Tong, Zhang & Li, 2019 — China
 Trilacuna diabolica Kranz-Baltensperger, 2011 — Thailand
 Trilacuna fugong Tong, Zhang & Li, 2019 — China
 Trilacuna gongshan Tong, Zhang & Li, 2019 — China
 Trilacuna hamata Tong & Li, 2013 — Vietnam
 Trilacuna hansanensis Seo, 2017 — Korea
 Trilacuna hazaraGrismado & Ramírez, 2014 — Pakistan
 Trilacuna kropfi Eichenberger, 2011 — Thailand
 Trilacuna loebli Grismado & Piacentini, 2014 — India
 Trilacuna longling  Tong, Zhang & Li, 2019 — China
 Trilacuna mahanadi Grismado & Piacentini, 2014 — India
 Trilacuna meghalaya Grismado & Piacentini, 2014 — India
 Trilacuna merapi Kranz-Baltensperger & Eichenberger, 2011 — Sumatra
 Trilacuna qarzi Malek Hosseini & Grismado, 2015 — Iran
 Trilacuna rastrum Tong & Li, 2007 — China
 Trilacuna simianshan Tong & Li, 2018 — China
 Trilacuna sinuosa Tong & Li, 2013 — Vietnam
 Trilacuna songyuae Tong & Li, 2018 — China
 Trilacuna werni Eichenberger, 2011 — Thailand
 Trilacuna wuhe Tong, Zhang & Li, 2019 — China
 Trilacuna xinping Tong, Zhang & Li, 2019 — China

See also

References

Oonopidae
Araneomorphae genera